Murders in... is a French television series. It has been distributed since 2013 on France 3 (France). Each episode takes place in a different locale outside the major cities, often in a region where the indigenous language is not French, and with different casts. The series is a huge success and one of France 3's biggest programs, followed by an average of 4 million viewers.

Season 1 (2013-14)

Episode 1 : Murders in Saint-Malo
 Aired : April 23, 2013
 Cast : Louise Monot as Lieutenant Gwenaëlle Garrec & Bruno Solo as Chief Warrant Officer Eric Vautier
 Director : Lionel Bailliu
 Ratings : 4.7 million viewers / (17.8% of viewers) / Rank : 2

Episode 2 : Murders in the Basque Country
 Aired : April 5, 2014
 Cast : Antoine Duléry as Vincent Becker & Claire Borotra as Marie Daguerre
 Director : Eric Duret
 Ratings : 4.1 million viewers / (17.6% of viewers) / Rank : 2

Episode 3 : Murders in Pyla
 Aired : April 12, 2014
 Cast : Dounia Coesens as Élise Castel & Véronique Genest as Carole Castel
 Director : Didier Albert
 Ratings : 4.1 million viewers / (18.4% of viewers) / Rank : 2

Episode 4 : Murders in Rocamadour
 Aired : May 3, 2014
 Cast : Clémentine Célarié as Sophie Lacaze & Grégori Derangère as Alexandre Delcroix
 Director : Lionel Bailliu (2)
 Ratings : 4 million viewers / (16.8% of viewers) / Rank : 3

Episode 5 : Murders in Rouen
 Aired : May 24, 2014
 Cast : Frédéric Diefenthal as Didier Mege, Isabel Otero as Eva Chene, Philippe Duquesne as Ludovic & Damien Bonnard as Gabriel
 Director : Christian Bonnet
 Ratings : 3.7 million viewers / (16.9% of viewers) / Rank : 3

Season 2 (2015)

Episode 6 : Murders in Guérande
 Aired : February 21, 2015
 Cast : Antoine Duléry as Vincent Becker & Claire Borotra as Marie Daguerre
 Director : Eric Duret (2)
 Ratings : 4 million viewers / (17% of viewers) / Rank : 2

Episode 7 : Murders on the Ile d'Yeu
 Aired : March 7, 2015
 Cast : Anne Richard as Isabelle Bonnefoy & Bernard Yerlès as Nicolas Lemeur
 Director : François Guérin
 Ratings : 3.9 million viewers / (16.9% of viewers) / Rank : 2

Episode 8 : Murders in Étretat (also known as The Cliffs Murder)
 Aired : April 4, 2015
 Cast : Adriana Karembeu as Karine Zenco & Bruno Madinier as Victor Ortega
 Director : Laurence Katrian
 Ratings : 4.1 million viewers / (17.9% of viewers) / Rank : 2

Episode 9 : Murders in Carcassonne
 Aired : May 9, 2015
 Cast : Rebecca Hampton as Angélique Demange, Bruno Wolkowitch as Raphaël Leprince, Philippe Nahon as Father Ancel & Bernard Blancan as William Malory
 Director : Julien Despaux
 Ratings : 4.2 million viewers / (18.6% of viewers) / Rank : 2

Episode 10 : Murders at Mont Ventoux
 Aired : May 23, 2015
 Cast : Ingrid Chauvin as Alex Mejean & Thomas Jouannet as Marc Messac
 Director : Thierry Peythieu
 Ratings : 4.3 million viewers / (19.9% of viewers) / Rank : 2

Season 3 (2015-16)

Episode 11 : Murders in Collioure
 Aired : October 3, 2015
 Cast : Helena Noguerra as Alice Castel & Stéphane Freiss as Pascal Loube
 Director : Bruno Garcia
 Ratings : 4.3 million viewers / (19.3% of viewers) / Rank : 2

Episode 12 : Murders in La Rochelle
 Aired : November 14, 2015
 Cast : Dounia Coesens as Justine Balmont & Philippe Caroit as Raphaël Weiss
 Director : Étienne Dhaene
 Ratings : 4.2 million viewers / (18.4% of viewers) / Rank : 2

Episode 13 : Murders in Burgundy
 Aired : December 26, 2015
 Cast : Cristiana Reali as Mylène Deville & Franck Sémonin as Frédéric Tessier
 Director : Jérôme Navarro
 Ratings : 3.8 million viewers / (17.1% of viewers) / Rank : 2

Episode 14 : Murders in Avignon
 Aired : February 27, 2016
 Cast : Catherine Jacob as Laurence Ravel, Lætitia Milot as Julie Ravel & Pascal Elso as Dimitri Bellac
 Director : Stéphane Kappes
 Ratings : 4.3 million viewers / (18.3% of viewers) / Rank : 2

Episode 15 : Murders on the Ile de Ré
 Aired : April 23, 2016
 Cast : Lucie Lucas as Margaux Pelletier & Bruno Salomone as Vincent Pelletier
 Director : François Basset & Jules Maillard
 Ratings : 4.5 million viewers / (20% of viewers) / Rank : 2

Episode 16 : Murders at Lac Léman
 Aired : May 21, 2016
 Cast : Corinne Touzet as Sandrine Zermatten & Jean-Yves Berteloot as Louis Jolly
 Director : Jean-Marc Rudnicki
 Ratings : 4.3 million viewers / (20% of viewers) / Rank : 2

Episode 17 : Murders in La Ciotat
 Aired : September 24, 2016
 Cast : Philippe Bas as Batti Vergniot & Élodie Varlet as Anne Sauvaire
 Director : Dominique Ladoge
 Ratings : 3.5 million viewers / (17.4% of viewers) / Rank : 2

Season 4 (2017)

Episode 18 : Murders in Dunkirk
 Aired : February 4, 2017
 Cast : Charlotte de Turckheim as Janie Roussel & Lannick Gautry as Eric Dampierre
 Director : Marwen Abdallah
 Ratings : 4.8 million viewers / (21.8% of viewers) / Rank : 1

Episode 19 : Murders in Martinique
 Aired : February 25, 2017
 Cast : Olivier Marchal as Paul Ventura & Sara Martins as Léna Valrose
 Director : Philippe Niang
 Ratings : 4.2 million viewers / (17.8% of viewers) / Rank : 2

Episode 20 : Murders in Grasse
 Aired : April 15, 2017
 Cast : Lorie as Sophie Mournel & Annie Grégorio as Marianne Dusseyre
 Director : Karim Ouaret
 Ratings : 3.7 million viewers / (17.8% of viewers) / Rank : 2

Episode 21 : Murders in Aix-en-Provence
 Aired : May 13, 2017
 Cast : Astrid Veillon as Anne Giudicelli & Isabelle Vitari as Pauline Dorval
 Director : Claude-Michel Rome
 Ratings : 4.1 million viewers / (18.2% of viewers) / Rank : 3

Episode 22 : Murders in Strasbourg
 Aired : May 27, 2017
 Cast : Olivier Sitruk as Maxime Keller, Hélène de Fougerolles as Katel Leguennec and Jean-Baptiste Maunier as Julian Mathis
 Director : Laurence Katrian (2)
 Ratings : 3.7 million viewers / (19.1% of viewers) / Rank : 2

Episode 23 : Murders in Auvergne
 Aired : September 30, 2017
 Cast : Frédéric Diefenthal as Bruno Romagnat & Sofia Essaïdi as Aurélie Lefaivre
 Director : Thierry Binisti
 Ratings :

Episode 24 : Murders in The Landes
 Aired : September 7, 2017
 Cast : Xavier Deluc as Walter Beaumont, Barbara Cabrita as Isabelle Hirigoyen & Catherine Hosmalin as Suzanne Beaumont
 Director : Jean-Marc Thérin
 Ratings :

Episode 25 : Murders in Sarlat
 Aired : November 18, 2017
 Cast : Thierry Godard as Éric Pavin & Cécile Bois as Claire Dalmas
 Director : Delphine Lemoine
 Ratings :

References

External links

2013 French television series debuts
2010s French television series
French anthology television series
French crime drama television series
France Télévisions crime television series
France Télévisions television dramas